Hyphorma flaviceps is a moth of the family Limacodidae. It is found in India and Vietnam.

References

Moths described in 1910
Limacodidae
Moths of Asia